Full Tilt is a book by Irish author Dervla Murphy, about an overland cycling trip through Europe, Iran, Afghanistan, Pakistan and India.
It was first published by John Murray in 1965. The book is usually given the subtitle Ireland to India with a Bicycle, but has been called Dunkirk to Delhi by Bicycle and From Dublin to Delhi with a Bicycle.

Full Tilt has been described as both one of the best cycling books, and one of the best travel books.

Summary

In 1963 Murphy set off on her first long-distance bicycle tour, a self-supported trip from Ireland to India. Taking a pistol along with other equipment aboard her Armstrong Cadet men's bicycle (named Rozinante in allusion to Don Quixote's steed, and always known as Roz), she passed through Europe during one of the worst winters in years. In Yugoslavia, Murphy began to write a journal instead of mailing letters. In Iran she used her gun to frighten off a group of thieves, and "used unprintable tactics" to escape from an attempted rapist at a police station. She received her worst injury of the journey on a bus in Afghanistan, when a rifle butt hit her and fractured three ribs; however, this only delayed her for a short while. She wrote appreciatively about the landscape and people of Afghanistan, calling herself "Afghanatical" and claiming that the Afghan "is a man after my own heart". In Pakistan, she visited Swat (where she was a guest of the last wali, Miangul Aurangzeb) and the mountain area of Gilgit. The final leg of her trip took her through the Punjab region and over the border to India towards Delhi. Her journal was later published by John Murray in 1965.

Editions

 1965: John Murray, 235pp.

 1967: Pan Books, 271pp.

 1983: Century (London), 235pp, .

 1985: Isis (Oxford), 305pp, .

 1991: Arrow Books, 235pp, .

 1995 (as Full Tilt: Dunkirk to Delhi by Bicycle): Flamingo (London), 244pp, .

 2004 (as Full Tilt: From Dublin to Delhi with a Bicycle): John Murray, 244pp, .

 2010: Eland Books, 235pp, .

References

External links
 

1965 non-fiction books
Eland Books books
John Murray (publishing house) books
Books by Dervla Murphy